Actinopeltis is an extinct genus of trilobite. It contains one species,
A. spjeldnaesi.

External links
 Actinopeltis at the Paleobiology Database

Cheiruridae
Phacopida genera
Ordovician trilobites of Europe
Sandbian
Fossils of the Czech Republic
Letná Formation